From Vienna with Love is the second studio album by Austrian pop singer Conchita Wurst and the Vienna Symphony. It was released on 19 October 2018 by Sony Music Entertainment. The album peaked at number one on the Austrian Albums Chart.

Background
Conchita and the Vienna Symphony performed together at the Vienna Festival in 2017. After the festival, they decided to team up again and record a joint album. The album includes beloved ballads and heartfelt songs symphonically arranged for the unique sound of the traditional Viennese orchestra conducted by Guido Mancusi. The album also includes a new version of her Eurovision Song Contest 2014 winning song, "Rise like a Phoenix". In an interview with Wiwibloggs, Wurst said "I'm over the moon, this really is a dream come true, that’s the soundtrack to my life. It's so overwhelming that I now have all of these songs that I have been singing for years and years on my own, in the shower or whatever, and now I'm performing them with an actual orchestra. It's a whole new experience. Listening to my music, and obviously for me performing my music, with an orchestra it's nerve-wracking. I have to be honest. So many people, and I get so nervous, and they are all depending on me. And they are all the best musicians you can get. I just want to live up to their standards. But I enjoy it so much. It's like a huge heart that is beating, this orchestra and it pulls you in and you can bathe in the sound".

Track listing

Charts

Weekly charts

Year-end charts

Certifications

Release history

References

2018 albums
Conchita Wurst albums
Sony Music albums